A flight procedure or instrumental flight procedure (IFP) is a set of predetermined maneuvers with specified protection from obstacles designed to achieve safe flight operations and an orderly flow of air traffic. Flight procedures linked to an aerodrome are specified as arrival, departure or approach procedure (usually linked with missed approach procedure).

Different types of instrumental flight procedures can be recognized:
 STAR (standard terminal arrival route)
 SID (standard instrument departure)
 IAP (instrument approach procedure) - supports landing operation, usually starts in range of 10 to 20 NM before the runway threshold
 MA (missed approach procedure) - usually linked do IAP procedure and published on the very same chart

See also
Aviation regulations
Instrument flight rules
Instrument approach
Approach plate
Flight planning

References
 D. Anderson, J. Robinson, and J. Towler, The Boeing Company, Seattle, WA; D. Pate, Federal Aviation Administration, Oklahoma City, OK; S. Barnes, L. Boniface, D. Lankford, and G. Legarreta, Federal Aviation Administration, Washington, DC; G. McCartor, Federal Aviation Administration, Oklahoma City, OK; E. Lassooij, International Civil Aviation Organization, Montreal, Canada; E. Bailey, Eurocontrol, Brussels, Belgium; and R. Putters, Civil Aviation Authority Netherlands, Amsterdam, The Netherlands Simulation Modeling in the Development of Flight Procedures and Airport Standards - AIAA-2005-5879 AIAA Modeling and Simulation Technologies Conference and Exhibit, San Francisco, California, Aug. 15–18, 2005 published by American Institute of Aeronautics and Astronautics
John-Paul B. Clarke; Nhut T. Ho; Liling Ren; John A. Brown; Kevin R. Elmer; Katherine Zou; Christopher Hunting; Daniel L. McGregor; Belur N. Shivashankara; Kwok-On Tong; Anthony W. Warren; Joseph K. Wat Continuous Descent Approach: Design and Flight Test for Louisville International Airport - Journal of Aircraft 2004 0021-8669 vol.41 no.5 (1054-1066)
Air Traffic and Navigation Services SOC Limited
What is a flight procedure? – Navdelta.com

Air traffic control